John Craggs (1849 – after 1874) was a poet from North Sunderland who wrote several poems and songs including "The Lass that sell’d grozers upon the aad bridge", an example of Geordie dialect.

Life 
John Craggs was born in 1849 in North Sunderland. It is assumed that this is the north part of Sunderland and not the tiny village of North Sunderland, which is now a suburb of Seahouses.
He was employed for several years as a clerk on the Tyne until in 1877, he migrated to the metropolis where he became a member of the Detective division of the police force.
He was a regular contributor to the local newspapers and used as a Pseudonym, the nom-de-plume of "Mrkg. Fudjjv", which is a cryptogram of his name.
In 1874 he was awarded Chater's gold medal for his sentimental song, "The Old Cot on the Tyne."
The date of his death is not known.

Works
Works include, among others:
 M.P. for Jarra (The)
 Letter from Hannah
 Old cot (The) – which won the 1874 Chater's gold medal
 Lass that sell’d grozers upon the aad bridge (The)
 Cuddy's egg  -  Comic song about hatching a 'cheese'
 Ninety-nine   song about old age, similar to Sair Fyel'd, Hinny

See also 
Geordie dialect words

References

External links
Allan's Illustrated Edition of Tyneside Songs and Readings &c.1891
Farne folk archives

1849 births
English male poets
English songwriters
People from the City of Sunderland
Musicians from Tyne and Wear
Geordie songwriters
Year of death missing